Campylite is a variety of the lead arsenate mineral mimetite which received the name from the Greek 'kampylos'- bent, on account of the barrel-shaped bend of its crystals. It has also been used as an alternate name for pyromorphite.

It occurs in the upper lead deposits through the oxidation of galena or cerussite. The main deposits are Příbram in Bohemia and Dry Gill, Caldbeck Fells, near Wigton, Cumbria, England.

References
Mindat with location data
Webmineral pyromorphite page

Further reading
 Mick Cooper and Chris Stanley, 1990, Minerals of the English Lake District, Natural History Museum Publications, London, 

Lead minerals
Arsenate minerals